"If You Want It" is the third and final single released off 2nd II None's debut self-titled studio album, 2nd II None. The song is produced by DJ Quik and samples Isaac Hayes's Hung Up on My Baby.

Track listings
CD single
"If You Want It (Radio Version)" – 3:28
"If You Want It (Remix)" – 3:48

Vinyl, 12", 33 ⅓ RPM, Promo 
"If You Want It (Album Version)" – 3:46
"If You Want It (Remix)" – 3:48
"More Than a Player" – 3:16
"If You Want It (Radio Version)" – 3:28
"If You Want It (Instrumental)" – 3:44

Chart performance

References

1992 singles
2nd II None songs
Song recordings produced by DJ Quik
1991 songs
Profile Records singles
Songs written by DJ Quik